Abdullah Mostafa (Arabic:عبدالله مصطفى) (born 6 March 1988) is a Qatari footballer who last played for Al-Khor.

References

Qatari footballers
1988 births
Living people
El Jaish SC players
Al Ahli SC (Doha) players
Al-Khor SC players
Qatar Stars League players
Qatari Second Division players
Association football midfielders